Veeravanallur is a selection grade special panchayat town in the Tirunelveli district in the Indian state of Tamil Nadu.

Demographics
 India census, Veeravanallur had a population of 19,681. Males constitute 49% of the population and females 51%. Veeravanallur has an average literacy rate of 76%, higher than the national average of 59.5%: male literacy is 83%, and female literacy is 69%. In Veeravanallur, 9% of the population is under 6 years of age.

Facilities
Veeravanallur Government Hospital and some private hospitals provide health care.

Schools

Bharathiyar Government higher secondary school
St.Johns Higher secondary school
Thiru Gnana Sambandar Middle school
RC Middle school
TDTA primary school
Indira nursery and primary school

See also
Seeniyapuram

References

Cities and towns in Tirunelveli district